Jorge de Meneses Baroche was the 6th Captain-major of Portuguese Ceylon. Baroche was appointed in 1559 under Sebastian of Portugal, he was Captain-major until 1560. He was succeeded by Baltasar Guedes de Sousa.

References

Captain-majors of Ceilão
16th-century Portuguese people